Headlong is a British touring theatre company noted for making bold, innovative productions with some of the UK’s finest artists.

Jeremy Herrin took over the artistic directorship of the company in 2013, and is the current artistic director.

Artistic director Rupert Goold, 2007–2013

Originally founded as The Oxford Stage Company in 1974, the company underwent a major rebranding and received its current name under the leadership of artistic director Rupert Goold (2005–2013).

Headlong's first season (2006–2008), was called Reinventing the Epic. Headlong began with two major revivals: Edward Bond's Restoration (with new songs written for the revival by Bond, scored by Adam Cork) and Tony Kushner's Angels in America. The major production, however, was Faustus. This radical reworking of Christopher Marlowe's epic was a reimagining, half-Marlowe and half new text (written by Rupert Goold and Ben Power) contrasting Faustus's story with that of the Chapman Brothers and their rectifying of Goya's The Disasters of War etchings by adding clown faces to them.

Goold directed a revival of King Lear in 2008, starring Pete Postlethwaite, however Headlong moved towards new work, including three new plays commissioned and developed in-house: Richard Bean's The English Game, Anthony Neilson's Edward Gant's Amazing Feats of Loneliness and, most notably, Lucy Prebble's ENRON. ENRON was one of two productions to transfer from this season into the West End. The other was Rupert Goold and Ben Power's reworking of Luigi Pirandello's Six Characters in Search of an Author, which reframed Pirandello's play in a contemporary structure.

In 2010 Headlong showcased two further new plays developed in-house: Earthquakes in London by Mike Bartlett which was produced at the National Theatre. Headlong's major production in 2011 was Decade, an unusual and ambitious multi-authored piece responding to the decennial of the 9/11 terrorist attacks. Directed by Goold, it was performed at St. Katharine Dock.

Headlong's fourth season (2012–2014) was announced via a 'season trailer' video released online, shot by the company itself, rather than a traditional press release, a move which provoked controversy in the theatre press.

The season included Lucy Kirkwood's play Chimerica (directed by Lyndsey Turner), which transferred to the West End in 2013 after an initial run at the Almeida Theatre. The production won several awards including: five Olivier Awards (Best New Play, Best Director, Best Set Design, Best Lighting Design and Best Sound Design); three Critics Circle Awards (Best New Play, Best Director and Best Designer); the Evening Standard Award for Best New Play; the Susan Blackburn Prize; and the National Stage Management Award for Stage Management Team of the Year.

Other new work included The Effect, a major new play by Lucy Prebble (directed by Rupert Goold) developed by Headlong and produced in late 2012 at the National Theatre. The Effect won the 2012 Critics' Circle Award for Best New Play.

Revivals included George Orwell's 1984 in a new adaptation by Robert Icke and Duncan Macmillan and opened at Nottingham Playhouse before embarking on a UK tour in the autumn of 2013. The production transferred to the West End in 2014, after a sell-out London run at the Almeida Theatre. The production embarked on a second UK tour during the autumn of 2014 and reopened in the West End in 2015 and 2016. In 2017, it played on Broadway, making it the company's single most successful show to date.

Artistic director Jeremy Herrin, 2013–present

Under Jeremy Herrin's artistic directorship Headlong's first big hit was The Nether by American playwright Jennifer Haley (directed by Jeremy Herrin), transferred to the West End in 2015 after a successful run at the Royal Court Theatre.

People, Places and Things by Duncan Macmillan (directed by Jeremy Herrin) played at the National Theatre in 2015 before transferring to The West End and will embark on a UK tour in 2017.

Other new work under Jeremy Herrin's artistic directorship includes Labour of Love by James Graham, featuring Martin Freeman and Tamsin Greig, Junkyard by Jack Thorne, and The House They Grew Up In by Deborah Bruce. The revival of both classic and modern masterpieces have also been part of the canon led Jeremy Herrin, including a radical new version of Frank Wedekind's Spring Awakening in an adaptation by Anya Reiss, David Hare's The Absence of War and Tennessee Williams's The Glass Menagerie. A successful tour of Pygmalion, radically re-imagined by director Sam Pritchard, was a hit for the company in 2017.

As well as touring their work across the UK, Headlong have toured many of their productions worldwide, including Observe the Sons of Ulster Marching Towards the Somme, written by Frank McGuinness and directed by Jeremy Herrin, which toured to the Republic of Ireland and France, as well as around the UK.

In September 2019, Herrin announced that he was stepping down as artistic director and will leave the company in 2020.

Emerging talent

Headlong has garnered a reputation for discovering the next generation of theatre artists. As Matt Trueman wrote in The Stage, 'Headlong has been full of bright young talent – Ben Power, Lucy Prebble, Robert Icke, Ella Hickson, Tom Scutt.'

The company has commissioned writers including James Graham, Penelope Skinner, Lucy Prebble, Ella Hickson, Lucy Kirkwood, Mike Bartlett, Ella Hickson, Duncan Macmillan, and Jack Thorne and employed directors including Natalie Abrahami, Steve Marmion, Carrie Cracknell, Jamie Lloyd, Simon Godwin, Ben Kidd, Sam Pritchard and Robert Icke and Blanche McIntyre.

Productions

Since 2006, productions have included:

Paradise Lost (2006) based on John Milton, adapted by Ben Power and Rupert Goold, directed by Rupert Goold.
Restoration (2006) by Edward Bond, directed by Rupert Goold.
Faustus (2006) after Christopher Marlowe's Dr Faustus, by Rupert Goold and Ben Power, directed by Rupert Goold.
Angels in America (2007) by Tony Kushner, directed by Daniel Kramer.
Rough Crossings (2007), Caryl Churchill's adaptation of Simon Schama's non-fiction book, directed by Rupert Goold.
The Last Days of Judas Iscariot (2008) by Stephen Adly Guirgis, directed by Rupert Goold.
The English Game (2008) by Richard Bean, directed by Sean Holmes.
...Sisters (2008) based on Anton Chekhov's Three Sisters, adapted and directed by Chris Goode.
Six Characters in Search of an Author (2008) by Luigi Pirandello, adapted by Rupert Goold and Ben Power, directed by Rupert Goold
King Lear (2008) by William Shakespeare, directed by Rupert Goold.
Edward Gant's Amazing Feats of Loneliness (2009) by Anthony Neilson, directed by Steve Marmion.
Medea Medea (2009) by Euripides, directed by Dylan Tighe.
Enron (2009) by Lucy Prebble, directed by Rupert Goold.
The Winter's Tale (2009) by William Shakespeare, directed by Simon Godwin.
Elektra (2010) by Sophocles, directed by Carrie Cracknell.
Lulu (2010) by Frank Wedekind, directed by Anna Ledwich.
Salome (2010) by Oscar Wilde, directed by Jamie Lloyd.
Earthquakes in London (2010) by Mike Bartlett, directed by Rupert Goold.
A Midsummer Night's Dream (2011) by William Shakespeare, directed by Natalie Abrahami.
Decade (2011) directed by Rupert Goold.
Romeo & Juliet (2012) by William Shakespeare, directed by Robert Icke.
Boys (2012) by Ella Hickson, directed by Robert Icke.
Medea (2012) by Euripides, adapted and directed by Mike Bartlett.
The Effect (2012) by Lucy Prebble, directed by Rupert Goold.
The Seagull (2013) by Anton Chekhov, adapted by John Donnelly and directed by Blanche McIntyre.
Chimerica (2013) by Lucy Kirkwood, directed by  Lyndsey Turner.
1984 (2013) by George Orwell, adapted and directed by Robert Icke and Duncan Macmillan.
American Psycho (2013) Book by Roberto Aguirre-Sacasa. Music and lyrics by Duncan Sheik. Based on the novel by Bret Easton Ellis. Directed by Rupert Goold.
Spring Awakening (2014) by Frank Wedekind, adapted by Anya Reiss and directed by Ben Kidd.
The Nether (2014) by Jennifer Haley, directed by Jeremy Herrin.
The Absence of War (2015) by David Hare, directed by Jeremy Herrin.
People, Places, Things (2015) by Duncan Macmillan, directed by Jeremy Herrin.
The Glass Menagerie (2015) by Tennessee Williams, directed by Ellen McDougall.
Observe the Sons of Ulster Marching Towards the Somme (2016) by Frank McGuinness, directed by Jeremy Herrin.
Boys Will Be Boys (2016) by Melissa Bubnic, directed by Amy Hodge.
This House (2016) by James Graham, directed by Jeremy Herrin.
Pygmalion (2017) by Bernard Shaw, directed by Sam Pritchard.
Junkyard (2017) by Jack Thorne, directed by Jeremy Herrin.
Common (2017) by DC Moore, directed by Jeremy Herrin.
The House They Grew Up In (2017) by Deborah Bruce, directed by Jeremy Herrin.
Labour of Love (2017) by James Graham, directed by Jeremy Herrin.
Meek (2018) by Penelope Skinner, directed by Amy Hodge.
Mother Courage and her Children (2019), by Bertolt Brecht in an adaptation by Anna Jordan, directed by Amy Hodge.

References

External links
 Headlong's website

Theatre companies in England
Theatre companies in London